Serap Güler (born 7 July 1980) is a German politician of Turkish origin from the Christian Democratic Union. She has been a Member of the German Bundestag since 2021, representing the Leverkusen – Cologne IV district.

Early life and career 
Güler grew up as the child of Turkish guest workers in Germany. After training as a hotel manager, she graduated in communication studies and German studies from University of Duisburg-Essen.

Upon graduation, Güler worked as advisor to State Minister for Generations, Family, Women and Integration Armin Laschet and State Minister of Health Barbara Steffen.

Political career 
Güler was elected to the Landtag of North Rhine-Westphalia in the 2012 North Rhine-Westphalia state election; at the time, she was her parliamentary group’s first member of Turkish origin. From 2012 until 2017, she served as her parliamentary group’s spokesperson on integration.

In 2015, Güler was part of a CDU working group on a reform of Germany’s legislation on immigration, chaired by Armin Laschet. Together with Thomas Strobl, Peter Hintze, Michael Kretschmer, David McAllister, Christina Schwarzer and Annette Widmann-Mauz, she co-chaired the CDU’s 2015 national convention in Karlsruhe.

Following the 2017 state elections, Güler was appointed State Secretary of Integration at the State Ministry for Children, Families, Refugees, and Integration, in the cabinet of Minister-President Armin Laschet. In the negotiations to form a fourth coalition government under Chancellor Angela Merkel following the 2017 federal elections, she was part of the working group on migration policy, led by Volker Bouffier, Joachim Herrmann and Ralf Stegner.

Member of the German Parliament, 2021–present 
In the 2021 German federal election, Güler contested Leverkusen – Cologne IV but came second to Karl Lauterbach. She was elected to the Bundestag on the state list. She has since been serving on the Defence Committee. She also joined a study commission set up to investigate the entire period of German involvement in Afghanistan from 2001 to 2021 and to draw lessons for  foreign and security policy in future.

Since 2022, Güler has been serving as deputy chair – alongside Mario Voigt – of a working group in charge of drafting the CDU’s new party platform, under the leadership of Carsten Linnemann.

In the negotiations to form a coalition government under the leadership of Minister-President of North Rhine-Westphalia Hendrik Wüst following the 2022 state elections, Güler was part of her party’s delegation.

Other activities 
 Islamkolleg Deutschland (IKD), Member of the Board of Trustees
 Institute for European Politics (IEP), Member of the Board of Trustees
 Otto Benecke Foundation, Member of the Board of Trustees

Political positions 
Güler is a part of the social wing of the CDU, and is a member of the Christian Democratic Employees' Association.

As a practising Muslim, Güler opposes abortion. She opposes children being forced to wear hijab.

Güler is a critic of President of Turkey Recep Tayyip Erdoğan.

References 

1980 births
Living people
Members of the Landtag of North Rhine-Westphalia
21st-century German women politicians
German politicians of Turkish descent
German Muslims
Members of the Bundestag for North Rhine-Westphalia
Members of the Bundestag 2021–2025
Female members of the Bundestag
Members of the Bundestag for the Christian Democratic Union of Germany
German anti-abortion activists
University of Duisburg-Essen alumni